Misery Days is the second album released by Oblivion Dust on July 23, 1998.

Track listing

1998 albums
Oblivion Dust albums